Zero is an unincorporated community located in central Lauderdale County, Mississippi, United States, located approximately  southeast of Meridian near U.S. Route 45 and is part of Meridian, Mississippi Micropolitan Statistical Area.

History
Zero was first known as "Pleasant Hill", and settlers were noted there as early as 1841.

In 1900, Zero had a population of 50.  Zero's post office was discontinued in 1905.

The Long Creek Volunteer Fire Department is located in Zero.  A recreation center is also located there.

References

Unincorporated communities in Lauderdale County, Mississippi
Unincorporated communities in Mississippi